Meganoplium is a monotypic beetle genus in the family Cerambycidae described by Linsley in 1940. Its single species, Meganoplium imbelle, was first described by John Lawrence LeConte in 1881 as Elaphidion imbelle.

Its larvae have been observed feeding on dead live oak. It occurs in the US state of California.

References

Hesperophanini
Monotypic beetle genera